Orlando Sanford International Airport  is in Sanford, Florida, United States, near Orlando. It was built as Naval Air Station Sanford, a Master Jet Base for carrier-based attack and reconnaissance aircraft, and was used by the U.S. Navy until 1969. The airport is owned and operated by the Sanford Airport Authority. It is a base for Allegiant Air. 

Sanford is Orlando's secondary commercial airport, but is farther away from downtown Orlando and Walt Disney World than the primary airport, Orlando International Airport (MCO/KMCO). Because of the affiliation with Orlando,  passenger traffic at Sanford was once dominated by European charter services.

Since 2008, however, a majority of its passenger traffic has been domestic; this is attributable to the entrance of Las Vegas-based Allegiant Air, for which Sanford is a focus city. Sanford was also a small focus city for the travel marketer Direct Air until the company's demise in 2012.

History

Naval Air Station Sanford

Orlando Sanford International Airport started life as Naval Air Station Sanford with the airport codes NRJ and KNRJ. Commissioned on November 3, 1942, the base initially concentrated on advanced land-based patrol plane training. It was used by the United States Navy until it closed in 1969.

Orlando Sanford International Airport
The City of Sanford assumed control of the former NAS Sanford in 1969 and renamed the facility Sanford Airport, hiring the air station's recently retired Executive Officer, Commander J. S. "Red" Cleveland, USN (Ret.), as the first Airport Manager. The city concurrently established the Sanford Airport Authority. For the next twenty-five years, the airport was a general aviation facility and periodically hosted civilian/military air shows and static displays. Initially an uncontrolled airfield, the control tower was reactivated in the early 1970s as a non-FAA facility, employing a number of retired enlisted Navy air traffic controllers who had served at NAS Sanford.

Additional name changes followed, to include Sanford Regional Airport, Central Florida Regional Airport, Orlando Sanford Regional Airport and the current Orlando Sanford International Airport. Through the 1980s and 1990s the oldest Navy buildings were demolished while those built in the 1950s and 1960s were renovated for civil use. New buildings and hangars were added.

OLF Osceola was transferred to the control of Seminole County, Florida, but was never officially recommissioned as an active airfield. In the 1970s the former OLF began to be used by general aviation drug-smuggling aircraft as a transshipment point. Following a major drug interdiction by local and federal law enforcement agencies, Seminole County placed large speed bumps at various intervals across the runway to deter future illegal use. By the 1980s the county began to use the site as a landfill and dump, demolishing the remaining runways.

1990s

In 1992, parts of the action film Passenger 57, starring Wesley Snipes, were filmed at the then-Orlando Sanford Regional Airport, where it represented a small airport in Louisiana. Shortly after filming, a new control tower was built and air traffic control operations assumed by the FAA. The Navy control tower and the large Navy hangar to which it was attached were demolished.

In the mid-1990s, a new passenger terminal capable of accommodating jet airliners was built. Charter airlines catering to the heavy British tourist demographic that had previously been using Orlando International Airport were offered greatly reduced landing fees at Sanford, and therefore many carriers relocated their operations.

In 1996 Michael Jackson and his team did the first rehearsals of the HIStory World Tour between July and August 1996 before going to Prague.

2010 - present 

In 2010, Allegiant Air announced it was moving many flights to the larger and more centrally located Orlando International Airport in order to compete with AirTran Airways. Owing to passenger feedback, all flights have returned to Orlando Sanford.

In 2014, Thomas Cook Airlines moved their operations back to Orlando International Airport after almost a decade of serving Orlando Sanford with the operations of Airtours, JMC Air & My Travel. In September 2019, Thomas Cook ceased all operations. 

Icelandair moved to Orlando International Airport in 2015.

In March 2015, Monarch Airlines ceased operations, after entering administration, therefore resulting in the termination of their flights to Sanford.  All flights were operated using their Airbus A330 and served London Gatwick, Manchester and Glasgow International.

In April 2016, Interjet operated flights to Mexico City. It later switched operations to the main Orlando airport from May 2018.

In 2017, Thomson Airways (now TUI Airways) began operating routes to UK airports. This was the largest international airline at the airport having served eight destinations around the UK. However, in November 2019, TUI Airways announced that from 2022, it would switch their Orlando operations from Sanford to Melbourne Orlando International Airport including the daily flights to/from those 8 British airports. This will bring their operations nearer to Port Canaveral where TUI Cruises will operate from in coming years. As a package holiday company this brings passengers closer to their cruises, although it has angered many TUI passengers who fly with the company to visit Orlando for Walt Disney World and Universal Orlando Resort.

In July 2021, Canadian low-cost carrier Flair Airlines announced they would launch service between Sanford and five Canadian destinations beginning in winter 2021. 

The airport is home to L3 Harris Airline Academy, which underwent several company changes and several name changes. The academy used to be known as L3 Commercial Training Solutions, Aerosim Flight Academy, and Delta Connection Academy, a subsidiary of Delta Air Lines. It provides  flight training for prospective regional airline and international pilots. The Seminole County Sheriff's Office has a hangar and support facility for aviation elements of the agency's Special Operations Division.

Facilities
The airport covers 3,000 acres (1,214 ha) and has four runways:

 Runway 9L/27R: 11,002 x 150 ft. (3,353 x 46 m), asphalt
 Runway 9C/27C: 3,578 x 75 ft. (1,091 x 23 m), asphalt
 Runway 9R/27L: 5,839 x 75 ft. (1,780 x 23 m), asphalt
 Runway 18/36: 6,002 x 150 ft. (1,829 x 46 m), asphalt/concrete

The dominant runway is 9L/27R. Parallel Runways 9C/27C and 9R/27L were built later, the former on a previous taxiway and the latter all-new, for small aircraft. The airport also has Runway 18/36, another Navy runway, for rare northerly fronts in the winter, but this 6000-ft runway is rarely used by airliners.

On December 31, 2019, there were 326 aircraft based at this airport: 221 single-engine, 53 multi-engine, 48 jet and 4 helicopters.

Airlines and destinations

Statistics

Top destinations

Annual traffic

Accidents and incidents
Numerous aircraft mishaps occurred during the World War II years, but detailed data are not readily available.
On March 29, 2007, Allegiant Air Flight 758, a McDonnell Douglas MD-80 aircraft that took off from Pease International Airport in Portsmouth, New Hampshire, experienced a hydraulic failure that prevented the nose landing gear from deploying. The plane made a safe landing at Orlando Sanford International Airport, with only one minor injury sustained in the aircraft evacuation.
On July 10, 2007, a Cessna 310, originating from Daytona Beach International Airport, Florida, en route to Lakeland Linder International Airport, Florida, crashed into two homes in Sanford, Florida, killing five people: the pilot, his passenger, and three people inside the houses. The pilot reported smoke in the cockpit and attempted an emergency landing at nearby Orlando Sanford International Airport. NASCAR said the pilot of the plane was Michael Klemm, a senior captain with NASCAR Aviation. His passenger was Dr. Bruce Kennedy, husband of International Speedway Corporation president Lesa France Kennedy, the daughter of the longtime head of NASCAR Bill France, Jr., who had died a month earlier in June 2007. They were the only two people on the plane, according to both NASCAR and the NTSB. Four people also were injured, three of whom were critically burned, authorities said. The NTSB factual report dated December 2007 indicates that the accident was caused by an electrical malfunction, including smoke in the cockpit, that occurred on the previous flight and that was not rectified prior to the accident flight, resulting in the subsequent fire. The accident pilot was informed about the known problem prior to flight but elected to fly the aircraft regardless.

References

External links

 Orlando Sanford International Airport
 
 

Airports in Florida
Airports established in 1942
Transportation in Orlando, Florida
Transportation buildings and structures in Seminole County, Florida
Sanford, Florida
1942 establishments in Florida